Three Dimensions Deep is the debut studio album by American singer, songwriter, and producer Amber Mark.  It was released on January 28, 2022 through PMR and EMI Records. The album was preceded by five singles: "Worth It", "Competition", "Foreign Things", "What It Is", and "Softly".

Critical reception

Three Dimensions Deep received generally positive reviews from music critics, receiving a 76 out of 100 on the review aggregate website Metacritic based on 7 reviews, indicating "generally favorable reviews". NPR Music described the album as Mark's attempt to work through "feelings of uncertainty" and experiences with loss. Pitchfork noted that "[m]oving smoothly between R&B, funk, and pop, the fully realized album foregrounds Mark’s vocals and songwriting" while bringing in sci-fi themes and "celestial metaphors". Rolling Stone was more mixed in its review, saying that the album was "short-circuited by hamfisted writing, especially as the album’s space theme gets less playful and more literal."

Track listing

References

2022 debut albums